Caffey is a surname. Notable people with the surname include:

Charlotte Caffey (born 1953), American musician and songwriter
Francis Gordon Caffey (1868–1951), American federal judge
Jason Caffey (born 1973), American basketball player
Lee Roy Caffey (1941–1994), American football player